Yukalikul (Yükälekül) is a rural locality (a village) in Takarlikovsky Selsoviet, Dyurtyulinsky District, Bashkortostan, Russia. The population was 100 as of 2010. There are 2 streets.

Geography 
Yukalikul is located 12 km northwest of Dyurtyuli (the district's administrative centre) by road. Yuntiryak is the nearest rural locality.

References 

Rural localities in Dyurtyulinsky District